Jay Van Andel (June 3, 1924 – December 7, 2004) was an American billionaire businessman, best known as co-founder of the Amway Corporation, along with Richard DeVos.

He also served as chairman of the U.S. Chamber of Commerce from 1979 to 1980

Early life 
Jay Van Andel was born on June 3, 1924 to James and Petronilla (Van der Woude) Van Andel in Grand Rapids, Michigan. His grandparents, Christian and Elizabeth had immigrated to America from the Netherlands in 1909.

Van Andel's parents were devout Christians and were members of the Christian Reformed Church. Jay credits his Christian background as being foundational for the rest of his life as a Christian. He once wrote, "Christianity involved the living out of Biblical values of honesty, generosity, and respect for others in our everyday life."

Jay attended Grand Rapids Christian High School. Later, Van Andel attended Calvin College and Pratt Business School in Kansas.

When World War 2 broke out, Jay served as a  United States Army Air Force officer. He was commissioned as a second lieutenant and trained crews for B-17 and B-29 bombers that reached the Japanese mainland.

Jay met Betty Jean Hoekstra while on a direct selling house call in the spring of 1951.  Soon they were dating and they were married on August 16, 1952.

Amway 
While attending the Grand Rapids Christian school before World War 2, Jay Van Andel met Rich DeVos. In 1949, Van Andel and DeVos became distributors of Nutrilite dietary supplements.  They added cleaning products including Liquid Organic Cleaner, to their core line of products in 1958. In 1959, the "American Way Association" began in the basements of the Van Andel and DeVos homes, and later that year "Amway Sales Corporation" was formed. A converted service station became Amway's first outside office building in 1960.

Today, Amway is a direct selling multinational company that sells a variety of health, beauty, and home care products. Amway went on to become the largest direct selling company in the world. Amway corporate reports that in 2019, they have over 3 million independent business owners (IBO's) in over 100 countries.

Van Andel Institute 
In 1996, Van Andel founded Van Andel Institute with his wife Betty. The 501(c)(3) nonprofit organization is located in Grand Rapids, Michigan and focuses on disease research and science education. Researchers look for ways to better diagnose and treat diseases, primarily cancer and neurodegenerative diseases such as Parkinson's. Education programs seek to inspire and prepare students to become the next generation of researchers.

In 2019, the Van Andel Institute was led by Jay's son, David Van Andel as Chairman and CEO.

Political activity and philanthropy 
A strong supporter of the Republican Party, Van Andel contributed $2 million to the re-election campaign of President George W. Bush, and $475,000 to the Michigan State Republican Party (mostly for state legislature candidates) in 2004 alone.  He was noted for his friendship with former President Gerald R. Ford, a native of Grand Rapids, who lamented his death and called him "a great family man and a worldwide leader in the business arena".  Steve Forbes wrote about Van Andel, "Whether in business or philanthropy, Van Andel understood that the primary goal was to serve the needs and wants of other people. He exemplified the best of America."

Awards 
In 1981, Van Andel received the Golden Plate Award of the American Academy of Achievement.

In 1993, Jay Van Andel was honored with an Edison Achievement Award for his commitment to innovation throughout his career.

Death 
Van Andel and his wife Betty both died in 2004; Betty had Alzheimer's disease, and Jay had Parkinson's.

References 

 This article contains content from HierarchyPedia article Jay Van Andel, used here under the GNU Free Documentation License.

1924 births
2004 deaths
American billionaires
20th-century American businesspeople
Amway people
Calvin University alumni
Deaths from Parkinson's disease
The Heritage Foundation
Businesspeople from Grand Rapids, Michigan
Neurological disease deaths in Michigan
People associated with direct selling
Michigan Republicans
People from Ada, Michigan
20th-century American philanthropists
American people of Dutch descent